Christopher Lee Clements (born 6 February 1990) is an English footballer who plays as a midfielder for Hednesford Town.

He has played in the Football League with Crewe Alexandra, Mansfield Town, Grimsby Town, Forest Green Rovers and Cheltenham Town, in Iceland with ÍBV and in Non-league football for Nantwich Town, Leigh Genesis, Stafford Rangers, Hednesford Town and Barrow.

Career

Crewe Alexandra
Clements began his career with Crewe Alexandra as a member of the club's renowned academy. His career debut came in a loan spell at Nantwich Town in 2008. Following this loan, Clements was sent out on loan to Leigh Genesis during the 2008–09 season, and also to Stafford Rangers, before signing his first professional contract with Crewe. Having signed his first contract, in 2009 Clements was loaned out once more, this time alongside A-Jay Leitch-Smith, to Icelandic club ÍBV, before returning to England early due to an injury crisis at his parent club.

Clements made his debut for Crewe on 7 November 2009, in a 3–2 FA Cup first round defeat away at Conference National side York City; starting on the substitutes' bench, he replaced James Bailey in the 90th minute. This proved to be Clements' only appearance for Crewe; at the end of the 2009–10 season, when his contract expired, he was released by the club.

Hednesford Town
In the summer of 2010, Clements joined Hednesford Town; he had a two-season stint at the club. He picked up the young player of the year award at the end of the 2011–12 season at the Northern Premier League's annual event.

Mansfield Town
Clements played as a trialist for Burnley's reserve side in a 3–1 win over Tranmere Rovers on 30 April 2012. In spite of the trial being unsuccessful, Clements was signed by Mansfield Town at the beginning of June 2012. After helping the Stags to the 2012–13 Conference National title, Clements was awarded a new contract at the club for 2013–14.

Grimsby Town
On 18 January 2017, Clements signed an 18-month contract with newly promoted League Two side Grimsby Town. He scored the opening goal on his debut for the club on 4 February 2017, a 56th-minute header, in a 1–1 draw against Luton Town. Clements didn't feature in a first team game for Grimsby during the 2017–18 campaign, mainly due to personal reasons and the need to gain match fitness.

He joined National League side Barrow on 29 September 2017 on a three-month loan deal. He debuted one day later in their 1–0 home defeat against Maidstone, and made seven appearances for Barrow before the loan expired on 25 November 2017. Clements joined newly promoted League Two side Forest Green Rovers on 31 January 2018, transfer deadline day, until the end of season. He debuted three days later, coming on in the 63rd minute as a substitute, in their 2–1 home victory against Coventry City. On 24 May 2018 Clements was released by Grimsby.

Cheltenham Town
In August 2018, Clements joined Cheltenham Town on a short-term deal. In May 2019 he signed a new one-year contract to remain at Cheltenham for the 2019-20 season. He helped Cheltenham reach the 2019-20 League Two play-offs, only for the team to bow out losing 3-2 on aggregate to Northampton Town over two legs.

In August 2020, he signed a new one-year contract to stay at Cheltenham for the 2020-21 season.

Nuneaton Borough
On 18 September 2021, Clements signed for Southern League Premier Division Central side Nuneaton Borough.

Return to Hednesford Town
On 22 September 2022, Clements departed Nuneaton Borough to return to league rivals Hednesford Town, ten years after departing the club previously.

Career statistics

Honours

Player
Hednesford Town
Southern League Cup (1): 2010–11

Mansfield Town
Conference Premier Champions: 2012–13

Cheltenham Town
League Two Champions: 2020-21

Individual
Northern Premier League Young Player of the Year award: 2011–12

References

External links

Living people
1990 births
English footballers
Association football midfielders
Expatriate footballers in Iceland
Crewe Alexandra F.C. players
Nantwich Town F.C. players
Leigh Genesis F.C. players
Stafford Rangers F.C. players
Íþróttabandalag Vestmannaeyja players
Hednesford Town F.C. players
Mansfield Town F.C. players
Grimsby Town F.C. players
Barrow A.F.C. players
Forest Green Rovers F.C. players
Cheltenham Town F.C. players
Nuneaton Borough F.C. players
National League (English football) players
Northern Premier League players
English Football League players
Southern Football League players